Kose is a small borough in Harju County, 39 kilometers (24 miles) southeast of Tallinn, Estonia. It is the administrative centre of Kose Parish and lies next to Pirita River.

At the 2011 Census, the settlement's population was 2,097.

It was first mentioned in the Danish Census Book as Cosius in 1241.

People
Otto von Kotzebue (1787–1846), navigator, is buried at the churchyard of Kose St. Nicholas Church
Risto Kübar (b. 1983), actor, was born in Kose
 Silver Kübar (et) (b. 1980), sidecar motorcross racer, was born in Kose
Liivo Leetma (b. 1977), footballer, was born in Kose
Rauno Roosnurm (b. 1991), musician, was born in Kose

Gallery

References

External links
 Kose Parish 

Boroughs and small boroughs in Estonia
Kreis Harrien